Endotricha flammealis, the rose-flounced tabby, is a species of snout moth, family Pyralidae.

Taxonomy
The proposed subspecies carnealis and several supposed varieties seem to be indistinguishable from typical individuals found in Austria.

Distribution
This species can be found in western, central and southern Europe and nearby regions. Its range extends to Turkey, Crimea, Cyprus, Iran (via the Caucasus), to Lebanon and Syria, and to Algeria and Tunisia.

Habitat
These moths inhabit grassland, heathland, woodland, fens, scrub and gardens.

Description

Endotricha flammealis has a wingspan of 18–23 mm. The forewings are oblong, rather pointed at the tip. The antennae of males are pubescent. The basic colour of the wings is extremely variable. It is usually ochre in colour, brown or pale brown, but it may also be pinkish brown. On the edge of the forewings there are characteristic darker brown markings and bright or pinkish lines. The front edge of the forewings shows also a series of small white spots. Sometimes the moths may be light coloured without almost no markings. These moths have usually a distinctive resting posture, with the head and the front part of the body raised on its forelegs and with bottom of wings touching the surface. The caterpillars are brownish.

Biology
The moths fly from July to August in the temperate parts of its range (e.g. in the British Isles) and are attracted to light. They mainly feed on nectar of Calluna vulgaris, Tanacetum vulgare, Chamerion angustifolium, Buddleja davidii, Heracleum sphondylium and Jacobaea vulgaris.

The females lay their eggs in summer on the underside of leaves. The caterpillars typically feed on common agrimony (Agrimonia eupatoria) and bilberries (Vaccinium), as well as on various plant remains and on dry leaves of willows (Salix) and oaks (Quercus).

References

External links
 
 Lepiforum.de
 Hants Moths

Endotrichini
Moths described in 1775
Moths of Africa
Moths of Asia
Moths of Europe
Taxa named by Michael Denis
Taxa named by Ignaz Schiffermüller